The 1940 United States presidential election in Minnesota took place on November 5, 1940, as part of the 1940 United States presidential election. Voters chose 11 electors, or representatives to the Electoral College, who voted for president and vice president.

Minnesota was won by the Democratic candidate, incumbent President Franklin D. Roosevelt won the state over dark horse Republican nominee Wendell Willkie of New York by a margin of 47,922 votes, or 3.83%. Nationally, Roosevelt was re-elected to an unprecedented third term as president, with 449 electoral votes and a 9.97% lead over Willkie in the popular vote.

Roosevelt was the only president of the United States who was elected to more than two quadrennial terms. He was also elected to a fourth term in 1944, although he died in office during that term. The 22nd Amendment, ratified on February 27, 1951, ensures that Roosevelt will continue, indefinitely, to be the only president of the United States to be elected to more than two terms, as the said amendment prohibits any person from serving more than two and a half terms as president.

Results

Results by county

See also
 United States presidential elections in Minnesota

References

1940
Min
1940 Minnesota elections